Kardolus is a surname. Notable people with the surname include:

 Arwin Kardolus (born 1964), Dutch fencer
 Olaf Kardolus (born 1963), Dutch fencer

See also
 Karolus